Christian Sigsgaard Petersen (born 14 March 1997) is a Danish tennis player.

On the junior tour, Sigsgaard has a career high junior ranking of 147, achieved in February 2014.

Playing for Denmark in Davis Cup, Sigsgaard has a win–loss record of 2–1.

See also
List of Denmark Davis Cup team representatives

References

External links 
 
 
 

1997 births
Living people
Danish male tennis players
People from Næstved Municipality
Texas Longhorns men's tennis players
Sportspeople from Region Zealand
21st-century Danish people